Final league standings for the 1924-25 St. Louis Soccer League.

League standings

Top Goal Scorers

External links
St. Louis Soccer Leagues (RSSSF)
The Year in American Soccer - 1925

1924-25
1924–25 domestic association football leagues
St Louis Soccer
St Louis Soccer
1924–25 in American soccer